Richard Boddington (born February 6, 1968) is a British-Canadian film director, writer, editor, cinematographer and television producer, with dual citizenship from the United Kingdom and Canada. Born in Yorkshire, England, he now resides in Ontario, Canada.

Career 
Richard began making films at the age of 12 using Super 8.  After seeing ET in 1982, he committed to being a filmmaker.  He kept making Super 8 films in high school, then moved onto film school in the USA.

From 1995–2000, Boddington worked as a Producer at the CTV Network in Toronto.

His first film was Dark Reprieve (2008), for which Boddington was the producer, director, editor and director of photography. He also self-financed it.

Richard then directed, produced and edited the family comedy film, The Dogfather (2010), which starred Chris Parnell.

In 2012, Boddington wrote, directed, edited and produced his third feature film, Against the Wild (2014), which was shot entirely on location in Northern Ontario.

The film tells the story of two children and their Alaskan Malamute, who must fight for survival after their plane crashes in the wilderness. Featuring a number of animals, a decision was made to exclusively use real animals and no computer generated ones. The film achieved world wide distribution and won such awards as the Director's Choice Grand Prize at the 2013 Rhode Island International Film Festival.  The film stars, Natasha Henstridge, CJ Adams and Erin Pitt.

Richard was nominated for the Emmy Award for Against the Wild in October 2014.

In May 2015, Boddington filmed Against the Wild 2: Survive the Serengeti in South Africa. The film is a sequel to Against the Wild and follows the Alaskan Malamute, Chinook, on another adventure. This time Chinook must protect two children after their plane crashes in the African bush. The film features extensive use of elephants, lions, giraffes, hyenas and leopards. The film stars Jeri Ryan, John Paul Ruttan and Ella Ballentine.

Against the Wild 2: Survive the Serengeti, was released into US theatres on February 26, 2016. The film went on to be highly successful in international sales, airing on many of the world's biggest broadcasters, including TF1 in France, STARZ in the USA, Antenna 3 in Spain, and Channel 5 in the UK.

In April 2017, Boddington began production on Phoenix Wilder and the Great Elephant Adventure, which starred Elizabeth Hurley and Sam Ashe Arnold, in South Africa.

The movie tells the story of an orphan boy who is adopted by his aunt and then moves to join her in Africa.  While on safari, Phoenix becomes lost in the African bush and befriends an elephant that helps him stop the efforts of elephant poachers.

The film had its world premiere at the Durban International Film Festival in July 2017. Phoenix Wilder was recognized by the Canadian government as a film that highlights the success of the Canada/South Africa co-pro treaty for film signed in 1997.

For a 2018 Fox News article, Boddington stated "The Great Elephant Census reported that between 2007 and 2014, Africa lost 144, 000 elephants.  Think about that number: 144, 000 elephants.  Knowing that the elephant has the longest gestational period of any animal at 22 months, just think about how long it would take to replace 144, 000 elephants with such a low reproductive rate!" 

Phoenix Wilder opened in 725 theatres in the USA on April 16, 2018, which made it one of the biggest theatrical releases of a Canadian film in over five years.  The movie was released on DVD and VOD in the USA by Lionsgate on October 23, 2018, and renamed An Elephant's Journey for the US market. Richard Boddington spoke about his experiences making the film with the International Elephant Foundation.  He said of his decision to use real elephants in the film, "Using a real animal is key to making these films, one could use computer generated animals that is true. However, you’ll never be able to program into a computer the unpredictability of a living organism."

In October 2019, Boddington began work on the third in his series of Against the Wild films, entitled, Against The Wild III: The Journey Home. This time Chinook, the Alaskan Malamute, must lead a shipwrecked blind man out of the wilderness, while his children launch a rescue mission of their own to find him.  Natasha Henstridge reprises her role from the first film, and stars as the aunt of the children. The film also stars Morgan Dipietrantonio, Zackary Arthur, Steve Byers, and Colin Fox (actor).  The film is distributed by Lions Gate in the US market as, Hero Dog: The Journey Home. The film attained a top 10 sales ranking in the USA, its first week in release.

On January 12, 2021, three of Boddington's films were shown on the new HBO Max platform in the USA. Against the Wild, Against The Wild II: Survive the Serengeti, and Phoenix Wilder and the Great Elephant Adventure, a.k.a., An Elephant's Journey.

In September 2021 Boddington began filming, Wickensburg, his seventh career feature film as writer, producer, and director.  The film tells the story of a recently widowed mother, played by Denise Richards, and her 13 year old son, Elliott, played by Jensen Gering. Who move to the small town of Wickensburg so that Richards can take a job as a reporter at the local paper.  Elliott soon meets a mysterious young girl named Willow, who tells Elliott about the curse Wickensburg is under.  Together Elliott and Willow embark on an adventure to save the town from an evil warlock.  Following the clues laid out in a strange book found in the attic of Elliott's new home.  Meanwhile, Denise Richards uncovers a corporate conspiracy to exploit the story of the old curse for profit.  The film stars Julian Richings as Mr. Hexenmeister, Maurice Dean Wint as Mr. Wilson, and Steve Byers as Uncle Dave.

Filmography

References

External links 
 

1968 births
Living people
English film directors
Film directors from Ontario